The Chinhoyi Caves (previously the Sinoia Caves) are a group of limestone and dolomite caves in north central Zimbabwe. Designated a National Park in 1955, and managed by the Zimbabwe Parks & Wildlife Management Authority.

Location
The caves are located in Makonde District, Mashonaland West Province, in north central Zimbabwe.

Overview
The cave system is composed of limestone and dolomite. The main cave contains a pool of cobalt blue water, which is popularly called Sleeping Pool or Chirorodziva ("Pool of the Fallen"). Divers have discovered a submarine passage leading from the Bat Cave, a subchamber of the Dark Cave to another room known as the Blind Cave. Diving is possible in the caves all year round, with temperatures never beyond the  range with zero thermocline. This site is often visited by diving expedition teams of technical divers that perform ultra deep diving. A campsite, run by the National Parks Authority, and a motel are located on-site.

History
The local name for the cave's pool, Chirorodziva ("Pool of the Fallen") comes from an incident that occurred in 1830, where members of the Angonni tribe attacked the local people and threw their victims into the cave to dispose of them.

The limestone caves were first described by Frederick Courtney Selous in 1888. These caves are the most extensive cave system in Zimbabwe that the public can access.

Religion
The caves have an important place in African Traditional Religion, with the caves themselves as a site for rainmaking, surrounded by a sacred forest, from which trees could not be felled.

See also

References

External links

Chinhoyi Caves Zimbabwe

Chinhoyi
Caves of Zimbabwe
Show caves
Limestone caves
National parks of Zimbabwe
Makonde District
Geography of Mashonaland West Province
Ramsar sites in Zimbabwe
Tourist attractions in Mashonaland West Province